Humberto Ivaldi (December 24, 1909 – March 10, 1947) was a Panamanian painter and director of the National School of Painting in Panama City from 1939 until his death in 1947.

He worked with many Panamanian painters, including: Cedeño, Oduber, Silvera, Jeanine, Benitez and Alfredo Sinclair.

References 

1909 births
1947 deaths
Panamanian painters
20th-century Panamanian painters